Dysautonomia or autonomic dysfunction is a condition in which the autonomic nervous system (ANS) does not work properly. This may affect the functioning of the heart, bladder, intestines, sweat glands, pupils, and blood vessels. Dysautonomia has many causes, not all of which may be classified as neuropathic. A number of conditions can feature dysautonomia, such as Parkinson's disease, multiple system atrophy, dementia with Lewy bodies, Ehlers-Danlos syndromes, autoimmune autonomic ganglionopathy and autonomic neuropathy, HIV/AIDS, autonomic failure, and postural orthostatic tachycardia syndrome.

The diagnosis is achieved through functional testing of the ANS, focusing on the affected organ system. Investigations may be performed to identify underlying disease processes that may have led to the development of symptoms or autonomic neuropathy. Symptomatic treatment is available for many symptoms associated with dysautonomia, and some disease processes can be directly treated.

Signs and symptoms
The symptoms of dysautonomia, which are numerous and vary widely for each individual, are due to inefficient or unbalanced efferent signals sent via both systems. The primary symptoms in individuals with dysautonomia include:

 Anhydrosis
 Anxiety
 Blurry or double vision
 Bowel incontinence
 Brain fog
 Constipation
 Dizziness
 Difficulty swallowing
 Exercise intolerance
 Insomnia
 Low blood pressure
 Orthostatic hypotension
 Syncope
 Tachycardia
 Tunnel vision
 Urinary incontinence or urinary retention
 Vertigo
 Weakness

Causes

Dysautonomia may be due to inherited or degenerative neurologic diseases (primary dysautonomia) or it may occur due to injury of the autonomic nervous system from an acquired disorder (secondary dysautonomia). The most common causes of dysautonomia include:

In the sympathetic nervous system (SNS), predominant dysautonomia is common along with fibromyalgia, chronic fatigue syndrome, irritable bowel syndrome, and interstitial cystitis, raising the possibility that such dysautonomia could be their common clustering underlying pathogenesis.

In addition to sometimes being a symptom of dysautonomia, anxiety can sometimes physically manifest symptoms resembling autonomic dysfunction. A thorough investigation ruling out physiological causes is crucial, but in cases where relevant tests are performed and no causes are found or symptoms do not match any known disorders, a primary anxiety disorder is possible, but should not be presumed. For such patients, the anxiety sensitivity index may have better predictivity for anxiety disorders, while the Beck anxiety inventory may misleadingly suggest anxiety for patients with dysautonomia.

Mechanism
The autonomic nervous system is a component of the peripheral nervous system and comprises two branches: the sympathetic nervous system (SNS) and the parasympathetic nervous system (PSNS). The SNS controls the more active responses such as increasing heart rate and blood pressure. The PSNS slows down the heart rate and aids in digestion, for example. Symptoms typically arise from abnormal responses of either the sympathetic or parasympathetic systems based on situation or environment.

Diagnosis
The diagnosis of dysautonomia depends on the overall function of three autonomic functions – cardiovagal, adrenergic, and sudomotor. A diagnosis should, at a bare minimum, include measurements of blood pressure and heart rate while lying flat, and after at least 3 minutes of standing. The best way to achieve a diagnosis includes a range of testing, notably an autonomic reflex screen, tilt table test, and testing of the sudomotor response (ESC, QSART or thermoregulatory sweat test).

Additional tests and examinations to determine a diagnosis of dysautonomia include:

Tests to elucidate the cause of dysautonomia can include:
 Evaluation for acute (intermittent) porphyria.
 Evaluation of cerebrospinal fluid by lumbar puncture

Vegetative-vascular dystonia
Particularly in the Russian literature, a subtype of dysautonomia which particularly affects the vascular system has been called vegetative-vascular dystonia. The term "vegetative" reflects an older name for the autonomic nervous system: the vegetative nervous system.

Similar form of this disorder has been historically noticed in various wars, like Crimean war and American civil war and among British troops who colonized India, this disorder was referred to as "irritable heart syndrome" (Da Costa's syndrome) in 1871 by American physician Jacob DaCosta.

Management

The treatment of dysautonomia can be difficult; since it is made up of many different symptoms, a combination of drug therapies is often required to manage individual symptomatic complaints. Therefore, if an autoimmune neuropathy is the case, then treatment with immunomodulatory therapies is done, or if diabetes mellitus is the cause, control of blood glucose is important. Treatment can include proton-pump inhibitors and H2 receptor antagonists used for digestive symptoms such as acid reflux.

For the treatment of genitourinary autonomic neuropathy medications may include sildenafil (a guanine monophosphate type-5 phosphodiesterase inhibitor). For the treatment of hyperhidrosis, anticholinergic agents such as trihexyphenidyl or scopolamine can be used, also intracutaneous injection of botulinum toxin type A can be used for management in some cases.

Balloon angioplasty, a procedure referred to as transvascular autonomic modulation, is specifically not approved in the USA for the treatment of autonomic dysfunction.

Prognosis
The prognosis of dysautonomia depends on several factors; individuals with chronic, progressive, generalized dysautonomia in the setting of central nervous system degeneration such as Parkinson's disease or multiple system atrophy have a generally poorer long-term prognosis. Consequently, dysautonomia could be fatal due to pneumonia, acute respiratory failure, or sudden cardiopulmonary arrest.

Autonomic dysfunction symptoms such as orthostatic hypotension, gastroparesis, and gustatory sweating are more frequently identified in mortalities.

See also 

 Dopamine beta hydroxylase deficiency
 Familial dysautonomia
 Reflex syncope
 Postural orthostatic tachycardia syndrome
 Orthostatic intolerance

References

Further reading 

 
 
 
 
 

Autonomic nervous system
Peripheral nervous system disorders